Konovalyuk or Konovaliuk is a Ukrainian-language surname derived from the occupation of  konoval [ коновал ], an archaic term for "veterinarian", literally meaning "descendant of konoval". Notable people with this surname include:

Oleksandr Konovaliuk, Ukrainian rower 
Valeriy Konovalyuk, Ukrainian politician and statesman

See also
Konovalyuk Commission
Konovalov, Russian surname with the same derivation

Ukrainian-language surnames
Occupational surnames
Patronymic surnames